Pyramid Saimira, an Indian multinational entertainment company, operating in 6 countries  was one of the World's fastest growing entertainment group. Its diversified businesses included Exhibition (Theatre), Film and Television Content Production, Distribution, Hospitality, Food & Beverage, Animation and Gaming, Cine Advertising, etc., which has significantly altered the profile of Tamil Nadu cinema, the Tamil film music scene and entertainment industry in India at large. Its founder and CEO died on 28 Jun 2019 due to diabetics related illness.

Filmography

Distribution 
Mozhi (2007)
Billa (2007)
Evano Oruvan (2007)
Azhagiya Tamil Magan (2007)
Ali Bhai (2007)
Kuselan (2008)
Saroja (2009)
Naan Kadavul (2009)

Production 
Kannamoochi Yenada (2007)
Aayudham Seivom (2008)

Debts, Problems and Closure 
Following the failure of Kuselan (2008), the production studio began to experience significant financial problems which affected several of their ongoing projects. The releases of films including Krishna's Yen Ippadi Mayakkinai starring Richard and Gayathrie and Jeppi Azhagar's Vaanam Partha Seemayile starring Ashok and Priyanka Nair, were sudden cancelled despite having audio releases. Likewise, Shankar Dayal's Anandham Arrambam, which was meant to be the launch for actor Adharvaa Murali, was also shelved despite beginning production. Kamal Haasan's bilingual period film, Marmayogi, was also scrapped after Pyramid Saimira were unable to finance the venture.

In the year 2010, the management was struck by debts ranging to Rs.500 Crore and cases were filed on it by SEBI for breaching its terms and finally closed down.

Share investors were duped by company's false auditing practices and internal scams. The promoter assured investors in their AGM that everything was in order and also acknowledged to make a dividend payout as a good will measure. It's another blot in ethics and corporate governance of the promoters.

Key Personalities 
These are the people who are mainly responsible for Pyramid Saimira.

References

External links 
Official Website
IMDB Profile

Film distributors of India
Film production companies based in Chennai
1997 establishments in Tamil Nadu
Indian companies established in 1997
Mass media companies established in 1997
Indian companies disestablished in 2010
Mass media companies disestablished in 2010